Edward L. Deci (born in 1942) is a professor of Psychology and Gowen Professor in the Social Sciences at the University of Rochester, and director of its human motivation program. He is well known in psychology for his theories of intrinsic and extrinsic motivation and basic psychological needs.  With Richard Ryan, he is the co-founder of self-determination theory (SDT), an influential contemporary motivational theory. Self-determination theory is a macro theory of human motivation that differentiates between autonomous and controlled forms of motivation; the theory has been applied to predict behavior and inform behavior change in many contexts including: education, health care, work organizations, parenting, and sport (as well as many others).

Deci is also Director of the Monhegan Museum in Monhegan, Maine.

Selected works 

 Deci, E.L. (1975). Intrinsic motivation. New York: Plenum Publishing Co. Japanese Edition, Tokyo: Seishin Shobo, 1980.
 Deci, E.L. (1980). The psychology of self-determination. Lexington, MA: D. C. Heath (Lexington Books). Japanese Edition, Tokyo: Seishin Shobo, 1985.
  
 Deci, E. L., & Ryan, R. M. (2000). "The 'what' and 'why' of goal pursuits: Human needs and the self-determination of behavior." Psychological Inquiry, 11, 227-268.
 Ryan, R. M., & Deci, E. L. (2000). "Self-determination theory and the facilitation of intrinsic motivation, social development, and well-being." American Psychologist, 55, 68-78.
  
  
 Ryan, R. M., & Deci, E. L. (2017). Self-determination theory: Basic psychological needs in motivation, development, and wellness. New York: Guilford Publishing. .

See also 
 Self-determination theory
 Organismic theory
Overjustification effect
 Motivation

References

External links 
 University of Rochester faculty page
 Self-determination theory website

Living people
University of Rochester faculty
1942 births
21st-century American psychologists
Motivation theorists
20th-century American psychologists